Tony Herman (born 18 August 1967) is a former professional rugby league footballer who played in the 1980s and 1990s. He played for the Newcastle Knights from 1989 to 1995.

Playing career
Herman made his debut for Newcastle against North Sydney at North Sydney Oval in Round 21 1989 which ended in a 14–1 victory.

In 1992, Herman played in the club's first ever finals campaign playing both games against Western Suburbs and St George.

In 1995, Herman played a career best 23 games for Newcastle as the club made it all the way to the preliminary final before being defeated by Manly 12–4.  This in turn would prove to be Herman's final game in first grade.

References

External links
http://www.rugbyleagueproject.org/players/Tony_Herman/summary.html

Australian rugby league players
Newcastle Knights players
Living people
1967 births
Place of birth missing (living people)
Rugby league wingers